Thomas Holm (born 1981) is a Norwegian footballer.

Thomas Holm may also refer to:

Thomas Holm (musician) (born 1978), Danish singer-songwriter
Tom Holm, professor of Native-American studies

See also
Thomas Heebøll-Holm, medieval historian
Thomas Holme (disambiguation)